Scaphium affine is a tree species in the family Malvaceae, subfamily Sterculioideae (previously placed in the Sterculiaceae and synonyms include Sterculia lychnophora Hance). It is native to mainland Southeast Asia and no subspecies are listed in the Catalogue of Life.

Scaphium affine has culinary and traditional medicinal uses. In English it is known as malva nut tree, or sometimes "Taiwan sweet gum tree", although these names also apply to the similar Scaphium macropodum (Vietnamese: ươi).

Description 
The tree grows to a height of 25–30 m. 
The dried seeds are the size of an adult's fingertip; they are brown and have coarse skin.

Common names for the malva nut 

  /mȁːk cɔːŋ/
 
 
  /sɑmraoŋ/.
  Niranjan Phal /NiRṃJN PhL/ (IAST)
  Malva Phal /MāLVā PhL/ (IAST)

Culinary and medicinal use of the nuts 
The seeds of this species and S. macropodum are used in traditional Indian medicine Ayurveda as well as traditional Chinese medicine as a "coolant", for gastrointestinal disorders, and for soothing the throat. As a result, it is collected as a major non-timber forest product in Laos, and is that country's second export crop after coffee.  Sterculinine is a bio-active alkaloid found in this species.

Malva nuts in soups and desserts 

The flesh surrounding the dried seeds swells to eight times its original volume when soaked in water, forming an irregularly shaped, reddish gelatinous mass. After being soaked and the seed kernel removed, the flesh is mixed with granulated white sugar, ice, and soaked basil seeds, and drunk as a cooling drink in Vietnam, Thailand, Laos and Cambodia. They are sometimes also used, along with other ingredients, in sweet, cool soups similar to the Chinese tong sui.

In China, malva nut is used in tea as well by mixing with other ingredients such as sugar candy, red date, haw, liquorice, chrysanthemum flower, lilyturfroot, and jasmine tea. The advantage of such tea is believed to reduce the "hotness" of the body, and nurture the body.

Malva nuts in traditional Chinese medicine 

According to Chinese medicine, the use of "Pang Da Hai" can remove heat from the lung, cure sore throats, counteract toxicity, and moisten the bowels. Specific symptoms treated include: hoarseness of voice, dry cough or productive cough with yellow sticky sputum, sore, dry throat due to heat in the lung and constipation with headache and bloodshot eyes. Consume malva nut by adding one or two nuts to a large cup of boiling water and consume the liquid. Typically, in traditional Chinese medicine, malva nut would be part of a larger formula of herbs designed to address a person's condition.

Although it possesses medicinal properties, care must be taken with its consumption. Avoid boiling more than 3 seeds per drink. Over-consumption symptoms include white watery phlegm, nausea, coughing, and swollen tongue. People with frequent digestion problems and abdominal pain or diarrhea should avoid it entirely.

References

External links

Malva nut on the Lao NTFP wiki
Detailed reference in the Lao NTFP network's "Tree tenure and forest management in Southern Laos" (pgs 4~14)

affine
Flora of Indo-China